Van Buren County is a county located in the U.S. state of Arkansas. As of the 2020 census, the population was 15,796. The county seat is Clinton. The county was formed on November 11, 1833, and named for Martin Van Buren, President of the United States, who was Vice President at the time of the county's formation. Van Buren County was a dry county until November 3, 2020 as the county residents voted to make it a wet county.

Van Buren County should not be confused with the city of Van Buren, which is located approximately 100 miles to the west in Crawford County just north of Fort Smith.

Geography

Major highways

 U.S. Highway 65
 Arkansas Highway 9
 Arkansas Highway 16
 Arkansas Highway 27
 Arkansas Highway 92
 Arkansas Highway 95
 Arkansas Highway 110
 Arkansas Highway 124
 Arkansas Highway 254
 Arkansas Highway 285
 Arkansas Highway 330
 Arkansas Highway 336
 Arkansas Highway 337
 Arkansas Highway 356

Adjacent counties
Searcy County (north)
Stone County (northeast)
Cleburne County (east)
Faulkner County (southeast)
Conway County (southwest)
Pope County (west)

National protected area
 Ozark National Forest (part)

Demographics

2020 census

As of the 2020 United States census, there were 15,796 people, 6,813 households, and 4,631 families residing in the county.

2000 census
As of the 2000 census, there were 16,192 people, 6,825 households, and 4,804 families residing in the county.  The population density was 23 people per square mile (9/km2).  There were 9,164 housing units at an average density of 13 per square mile (5/km2).  The racial makeup of the county was 96.79% White, 0.31% Black or African American, 0.75% Native American, 0.25% Asian, 0.04% Pacific Islander, 0.37% from other races, and 1.48% from two or more races.  1.33% of the population were Hispanic or Latino of any race, but the percentage could increased 3 or 4 times by seasonal migrant laborers in the county's shiitake mushroom harvest and hospitality jobs provided by the Fairfield Bay resort hotel. 

There were 6,825 households, out of which 25.20% had children under the age of 18 living with them, 59.10% were married couples living together, 7.70% had a female householder with no husband present, and 29.60% were non-families. 26.40% of all households were made up of individuals, and 14.40% had someone living alone who was 65 years of age or older.  The average household size was 2.33 and the average family size was 2.79.

In the county, the population was spread out, with 21.50% under the age of 18, 6.60% from 18 to 24, 23.00% from 25 to 44, 25.50% from 45 to 64, and 23.30% who were 65 years of age or older.  The median age was 44 years. For every 100 females there were 96.70 males.  For every 100 females age 18 and over, there were 93.00 males.

The median income for a household in the county was $27,004, and the median income for a family was $32,284. Males had a median income of $25,821 versus $18,862 for females. The per capita income for the county was $16,603.  About 11.60% of families and 15.40% of the population were below the poverty line, including 21.90% of those under age 18 and 10.60% of those age 65 or over.

Government

The county government is a constitutional body granted specific powers by the Constitution of Arkansas and the Arkansas Code. The quorum court is the legislative branch of the county government and controls all spending and revenue collection. Representatives are called justices of the peace and are elected from county districts every even-numbered year. The number of districts in a county vary from nine to fifteen, and district boundaries are drawn by the county election commission. The Van Buren County Quorum Court has nine members. Presiding over quorum court meetings is the county judge, who serves as the chief operating officer of the county. The county judge is elected at-large and does not vote in quorum court business, although capable of vetoing quorum court decisions.

Politics
Over the past few election cycles Van Buren County, like all of the traditionally secessionist and Democratic Upland South, has trended heavily towards the GOP. The last Democrat to carry this county was Bill Clinton in 1996.

Communities

Cities
Clinton (county seat)
Fairfield Bay (partly in Cleburne County)

Towns
Damascus (partly in Faulkner County)
Shirley

Census-designated place
Dennard

Other unincorporated communities

Alread
Archey Valley
Austin
Bee Branch
Botkinburg
Chimes
Choctaw
Choctaw Pines
Claude
Copeland
Crabtree
Culpepper
Dabney
Eglantine
Elba
Fairbanks
Formosa
Gravesville
Gravel Hill
Green Tree
Half Moon
Morganton
Old Botkinburg
Palisades
Pee Dee
Plant
Pleasant Grove
Rabbit Ridge
Rex
Rocky Hill
Rumley
Rupert
Scotland
Southside
Stumptoe
Sulphur Springs
Walnut Grove
Whipple
Woodlum
Zion Hill

Townships

See also
 List of lakes in Van Buren County, Arkansas
 National Register of Historic Places listings in Van Buren County, Arkansas

References

External links
 Map of Van Buren County from the U. S. Census Bureau
 Van Buren County official website 
 Van Buren County, Arkansas entry on the Encyclopedia of Arkansas History & Culture

 
1833 establishments in Arkansas Territory
Populated places established in 1833